Hermann Glauert, FRS (4 October 1892 – 6 August 1934) was a British aerodynamicist and Principal Scientific Officer of the Royal Aircraft Establishment, Farnborough until his death in 1934.

Early life and education 
Glauert was born in Sheffield, Yorkshire; his father Louis Glauert was a cutlery manufacturer. He attended King Edward VII School, Sheffield and Trinity College, Cambridge.

Career 
Glauert wrote numerous reports and memoranda dealing with aerofoil and propeller theory. His book, The Elements of Aerofoil and Airscrew Theory  was the single most important instrument for spreading airfoil and wing theory around the English speaking world.

Glauert independently developed Prandtl-Glauert method from the then-existing aerodynamic theory and published his results in The Proceedings of the Royal Society in 1928.

In the 1930s, he was the academic supervisor of aerodynamicist and educationalist Gwen Alston.

Death 
Glauert died aged 41 in an accident in a small park in Fleet common in Farnborough.

His school said of him "The tragic and incalculable accident which resulted in the death of Hermann Glauert concerned us also, though less intimately. H. Glauert was a distinguished Edwardian of the early days, leaving the School with a mathematical scholarship to Trinity, Cambridge, in 1910. He became a Fellow of the Royal Society, principal scientific officer at the Royal Aircraft Establishment, Farnborough, and no less than an international authority on aeronautical science (cf Prandtl-Glauert singularity). He was killed by a chance fragment of a tree that was being blown up on Aldershot Common."

Personal life
Glauert married fellow RAE Farnborough aerodynamicist Muriel Barker (1892–1949). They had three children: a son, Michael (1924–2004), and twins Audrey (1925-2014) and Richard (1925-2016).

Glauert is buried in the Ship Lane Cemetery, Farnborough. After Muriel Glauert's death in 1949, she was buried alongside her husband.

Publications
 The Elements of Aerofoil and Airscrew Theory - Cambridge University Press - 1926

See also
 Prandtl-Glauert method
 Royal Aircraft Establishment (RAE)

References

External links
King Edward VII School Magazine, December 1934
"Hermann Glauert FRS, FRAeS (1892 – 1934)" a paper on Glauert's work (PDF) 
 "A Paper on Spins" a 1920 lecture of Glauert's published in Flight
 The Flight news item reporting the death of Mr. H. Glauert

1892 births
1934 deaths
Accidental deaths in England
Aerodynamicists
Alumni of Trinity College, Cambridge
Fellows of the Royal Society
Fluid dynamicists
People educated at King Edward VII School, Sheffield
Scientists from Yorkshire